The Ford 385 engine family (also code-named "Lima") is a series of big block V8 engines designed by Ford Motor Company. The family derives its name from the  crankshaft stroke of the 460 cubic-inch V8 introduced in 1968.
A  version was also introduced the same year, with a  variant appearing in 1977. 

Produced until 1998, the Lima engines replaced the MEL engine entirely, along with multiple engines of the medium-block FE engine family; in truck applications, the engines succeeded the much larger Super Duty family.

The Lima engines were used across multiple applications in North America.  In cars, the engines saw use by all three Ford divisions in full-size cars, intermediates, personal luxury cars, and muscle cars.  In trucks, the engine family was used in full-size trucks and vans, along with medium and heavy-duty trucks.

Produced in Lima, Ohio at the Lima engine plant, the engine family was the final big-block V8 designed and produced by Ford during the 20th century.  After 1978, the engines were phased out of Ford cars as its full-size cars underwent downsizing (intermediates last used the engines in 1976).  Following its shift to truck use, the Lima engines were joined by multiple diesel-powered engines.

In 1997, Ford introduced the overhead-cam Triton V10, which replaced the Lima V8 engine family after the 1998 model year; the next overhead-valve large-block V8 produced by Ford is the 7.3 L "Godzilla" V8 introduced for 2020.

Versions 
The engine was produced in 370 (6.1 L), 429 (7.0 L), and 460 cubic-inch (7.5 L) displacements.  To reduce weight over their predecessors, the 385 engines utilized thinwall casting methods and a skirtless block.

370
The smallest-displacement engine of the 385 engine family, the 370 was introduced in 1977, replacing the  360 Truck (FT) V8. Sharing its 3.59-inch stroke with the 429, the 370 was designed with a downsized 4.05-inch bore (shared with its predecessor and the 390 V8). In 1979, the engine was rebranded in metric, as 6.1 L.

After 1991 production, the 370 was discontinued, with the 460 replacing it in all truck applications.

Applications:

 Ford medium-duty F-Series (1977-1991)
 Ford F600/F700
 Ford B-Series (1977-1991)
 Ford C-Series (1979-1990)
 Ford C600-C800 
 Ford L-Series "Louisville Line" (1977-c.1991)
 Ford L600-L800

429 
Developed to replace the largest of the FE-series V8s, the 429 replaced the 390, 427, and 428 V8s.  Introduced in the 1968 Ford Thunderbird, the engine saw use across Ford and Mercury full-size and intermediate product lines.  Replaced by the 460 in Ford and Lincoln-Mercury cars, it was only available in medium-duty Ford trucks after the 1973 model year.

The engine became marketed in metric for 1979, as the 7.0 L "Lima" V8. Initially replacing the 401 Super Duty V8, the 7.0 replaced the 477 and 534 Super Duty engines for 1982. After 1991, the 429 became the sole gasoline engine offered in Ford commercial trucks; the 460/7.5 L was used in trucks under 1½-ton payload.

Sharing its 4.36-inch bore with the 460, the 429 was designed with a shorter 3.59-inch stroke.

Applications:

 Ford Thunderbird (1968-1973)
 Ford Mustang (1969-1971)
 Ford Mustang Boss 429 (1969-1970)
 Ford/Mercury full-size (1969-1973)
 Ford/Mercury intermediate (1969-1973)
 Mercury Cougar (1971)
 Ford medium-duty F-Series (1977-1991)
 Ford F600/F700/F800
 Ford B-Series (1977-1991)
 Ford C-Series (1979-1990)
 Ford C900 
 Ford L-Series "Louisville Line" (1977-c.1991)
 Ford L900

460 

The largest-displacement 385 engine, the 460 was developed as the successor for the 462 MEL V8 and the 390 FE/FT V8. It shared a 4.36-inch bore with the 429 but the 460 was designed with a 3.85-inch stroke. For 1968, it was introduced in the Continental Mark III and availability was exclusive to Lincolns until 1971. In 1972, the engine was introduced for the Mercury Marquis and Colony Park. For 1973, the 460 was added to Ford full-size cars, Ford and Mercury intermediates, and Ford F-Series trucks. In 1975, it later became available on Econoline vans.      

From 1968 to 1971, the 460 was rated at 365 gross hp. For 1972, advertised power saw a significant numeric decrease; along with a reduction in the compression ratio (to 8.5:1) and modification of camshaft timing, the rated output was primarily changed by the adoption of SAE net horsepower as a standard in North America (accounting for the power losses created by engine accessories and exhaust system).

As Ford began to respond to the implementation of CAFE during the late 1970s, the 460 V8 (previously standard in Lincolns and full-size Mercury lines) became an option, with the 400 V8 (335-series) becoming the standard V8 engine; after 1976, the engine was removed from intermediate-sized cars entirely. Coinciding with their eventual downsizing, full-sized Ford and Lincoln-Mercury cars (including the Continental Mark V) last used the 460 for the 1978 model year.  

From 1980 to 1982, the 460 was exclusive to the Econoline 350 van, as the 400 V8 became the largest engine for F-Series trucks. For 1983, the 460 returned to the F-Series, replacing the 400.

Through its fitment on chassis-cab versions of the F-Series and cutaway cab configurations of the E-Series, the 460 saw many applications of commercial use; other applications include recreational vehicles/RVs and bus use. As a crate engine, the 460 was produced by Ford Motorsports through 1997. After the 1997 model year, the 460 was replaced by the 6.8 L V10. 

Applications:
 Lincoln Continental (1968–1979)
 Ford Thunderbird (1972-1976)
 Mercury Cougar (1974-1976)
 Ford/Mercury full-size (1972-1978)
 Ford/Mercury intermediate (1973-1976)
 Ford F-Series (1973-1997)
 Ford E-Series (1975-1996)

514
A 514 cu in (8.4 L) crate engine was also available from Ford SVO

572
A 572 cu in (9.4 L) crate engine ( bore and  stroke) is available from Ford Performance Parts.

High-performance street variants
Ford developed two high-performance street versions of the 385 engine family to succeed the FE engine family between 1969 and 1971, both based on the 429.

The 429 Cobra Jet (429CJ) was fitted with a Rochester Quadrajet  Spreadbore 4-bbl carburetor, a larger camshaft; a special set of cylinder heads (DOOE-R) 73.5 CC, combustion chamber and canted valve configuration, with push rod guide plates (DIOE-6465-AA) Intakes valves were 2.24 and exhaust valves were 1.74, with non-adjustable hydraulic lifters. This  allowed for an 11.3:1 compression ratio, increasing output to 370 hp.  The engine was fitted with or without a hood scoop, matched with a 3.25:1 rear-axle ratio.  When fitted with a "shaker" hood scoop, a 429 CJ-Ram Air equipped vehicle received a 3.50:1 rear axle.  In 1971, the CJ engine also used a four-bolt main block DOVE-A.

The 429 Super Cobra Jet (429SCJ) was fitted with a Holley  Vac-Secondaries Square-bore 4-bbl carburetor, larger mechanical camshaft, a four-bolt main block, forged pistons, single valve relief, forged rods, and Brindle tested cast iron crankshaft.  The engine output was increased to 375 hp and 450 lb-ft of torque, matched with a 3.91:1 or 4.30:1 rear axle ratio.

Police Interceptor engines 
For police use, Ford developed Police Interceptor versions of the 429 and 460.  Depending on horsepower rating systems (gross vs. net) and emissions tuning, engine output ranged from 210-375 hp.  The Ford 460 engine would become the highest-displacement V8 ever used by police agencies, followed by the Pontiac 455 Police Enforcer, Chevrolet 454 Police Apprehender, and Chrysler/Dodge 440 Police Pursuit V8s.

The 1971 429 Police Interceptor was tuned similar to the 429 Cobra Jet, with an 11.3:1 compression ratio; with forged single valve notched pistons the engine was rated at 370 hp (gross).

From 1973 to 1978, Ford offered two versions of the 460 police engine. The lower-output 460 Police Cruiser and the higher-output 460 Police Interceptor. The basic 460 PC, identified by engine code "A" denotes Basic passenger car 460 in the installed vehicle's vehicle identification number (VIN) and the engine's valve cover spec sticker, was recommended for city and suburban use, while the 460 PI, identified by the engine code "C" in its VIN and on its spec sticker, was built for high speed highway patrol and interstate applications. The two were commonly confused with each other, the "A" code 460 being a basic, street/production stock flowing engine with additional cooling bolt-ons and a block-mounted non-electric fuel pump. The more powerful "C" code 460 Police Interceptor featured a higher lift camshaft and better flowing heads (D2OE-AB) or (D3OE-AA, AB) and exhaust system, along with a high flow, in-tank electric fuel pump, as the stock, block-mounted, cam-driven vacuum lift fuel pump would starve the motor for fuel above . The 460 Interceptor was capable of producing speeds in excess of  when installed in certain vehicles.

Specifications

All engines

Deck height (early block): Deck height (late block, D9TE): Rod length: Bore spacing 

370

Bore x stroke: 

429

Bore x stroke: 
Chamber size (D00E-R) 75cc Cobra Jet 
Chamber size (C8VE/C9VE/D0VE) 72cc ThunderJet 
Chamber size (D2VE) ~99-100cc Passenger head
Chamber size (D20E) ~99-100cc Police Interceptor

460

Bore x stroke: 
Chamber size (C8VE/C9VE/D0VE) 72cc ThunderJet Avail in 460 Lincoln Motor High Compression  
Chamber size (D3VE/E8TE): ~93-95cc Passenger Heads
Chamber size (F3TZ) 89.5-92.5cc

2 valves per cylinder (although labeled 460-4V - "V" stands here for "venturi" and addresses the carburetor capacity)

See also 

 List of Ford engines
 Lima Engine

References

External links
Short descriptions of Ford overhead valve V8 engines
- 460 ford.com Great site with info on the 385 Ford engine

385
V8 engines
Gasoline engines by model